The 2020–21 Eredivisie was the 65th season of the Eredivisie since its establishment in 1955. The season began on 12 September 2020 and concluded on 16 May 2021.

On 2 February 2021, the KNVB announced that effective immediately clubs would be allowed to make an extra substitution for suspected concussions as part of an IFAB sanctioned trial. This trial will allow teams to make up to six substitutions across four breaks in the match instead of five substitutions across three breaks in the match.

Ajax, having won the title in 2018–19, were the title holders, since the 2019–20 edition was cancelled due to the COVID-19 pandemic in the Netherlands after 25  matchdays and the title was not awarded.

Teams 
A total of 18 teams are taking part in the league. There were no changes in the league's makeup due to the COVID-19 pandemic.

Stadiums and locations

Personnel and kits

Managerial changes

Regular competition

Standings

Results

Results by round

Play-offs 
For both play-offs, who plays who, is not decided based on draws, but the brackets are fully preset based on seeds. The seeds are assigned based on the final ranking after the regular season. The best ranked team will get the highest seed (lowest number). Eredivisie teams are considered to be better ranked than eerste divisie teams.

Contrary to previous years, all rounds are no longer two legs (home and away) but a single leg. The team with the best seed will get the home advantage.

If a match is leveled at the end of the normal playing time, extra time will be played (two periods of 15 minutes each) and followed, if necessary, by a penalty shoot-out to determine the winners.

European competition play-offs 
The four best ranked teams without a European tournament ticket will play for one spot in the 2021–22 UEFA Europa Conference League second qualifying round. The highest seeded team will always play at home.

Teams

Bracket

Semifinals

Final

Promotion/relegation play-offs 
Seven teams, six from the 2020–21 Eerste Divisie and one from the Eredivisie, will play for a spot in the 2021–22 Eredivisie. The remaining six teams will play in the 2021–22 Eerste Divisie. The highest seeded team or the team from the Eredivisie will always play at home.

Teams

Bracket

First round

Semifinals

Final

Statistics

Top scorers

Hat-tricks

Top assists

Clean sheets

Discipline

Player
 Most yellow cards: 9
  Vito van Crooij (VVV-Venlo)
  Vurnon Anita (RKC Waalwijk)
 Most red cards: 2
  Riechedly Bazoer (Vitesse)
  Edson Álvarez (Ajax)
  Thomas Lam (PEC Zwolle)
  Christian Kum (VVV-Venlo)

Club
 Most yellow cards: 54
 Vitesse
 ADO Den Haag
 Most red cards: 7
 AZ

Awards

Monthly awards

Annual awards

References

External links

2020–21
1
Netherlands